In seven-dimensional geometry, a pentellated 7-orthoplex is a convex uniform 7-polytope with 5th order truncations (pentellation) of the regular 7-orthoplex.

These polytopes are a part of a set of 127 uniform 7-polytopes with B7 symmetry.

Pentellated 7-orthoplex

Alternate names
 Small  hecatonicosoctaexon (acronym: Staz) (Jonathan Bowers)

Coordinates 
Coordinates are permutations of (0,1,1,1,1,1,2)

Images

Pentitruncated 7-orthoplex

Alternate names
 Teritruncated hecatonicosoctaexon (acronym: Tetaz) (Jonathan Bowers)

Images

Coordinates
Coordinates are permutations of (0,1,1,1,1,2,3).

Penticantellated 7-orthoplex

Alternate names
 Terirhombated hecatonicosoctaexon (acronym: Teroz) (Jonathan Bowers)

Coordinates 
Coordinates are permutations of (0,1,1,1,2,2,3).

Images

Penticantitruncated 7-orthoplex

Alternate names
 Terigreatorhombated hecatonicosoctaexon (acronym: Tograz) (Jonathan Bowers)

Coordinates
Coordinates are permutations of (0,1,1,1,2,3,4).

Pentiruncinated 7-orthoplex

Alternate names
 Teriprismated hecatonicosoctaexon (acronym: Topaz) (Jonathan Bowers)

Coordinates
The coordinates are permutations of (0,1,1,2,2,2,3).

Images

Pentiruncitruncated 7-orthoplex

Alternate names
 Teriprismatotruncated hecatonicosoctaexon (acronym: Toptaz) (Jonathan Bowers)

Coordinates
Coordinates are permutations of (0,1,1,2,2,3,4).

Images

Pentiruncicantellated 7-orthoplex

Alternate names
 Teriprismatorhombated hecatonicosoctaexon (acronym: Toparz) (Jonathan Bowers)

Coordinates 
Coordinates are permutations of (0,1,1,2,3,3,4).

Images

Pentiruncicantitruncated 7-orthoplex

Alternate names
 Terigreatoprismated hecatonicosoctaexon (acronym: Tegopaz) (Jonathan Bowers)

Coordinates
Coordinates are permutations of (0,1,1,2,3,4,5).

Images

Pentistericated 7-orthoplex

Alternate names
 Tericellated hecatonicosoctaexon (acronym: Tocaz) (Jonathan Bowers)

Images

Coordinates
Coordinates are permutations of (0,1,2,2,2,2,3).

Pentisteritruncated 7-orthoplex

Alternate names
 Tericellitruncated hecatonicosoctaexon (acronym: Tacotaz) (Jonathan Bowers)

Coordinates
Coordinates are permutations of (0,1,2,2,2,3,4).

Images

Pentistericantellated 7-orthoplex

Alternate names
 Tericellirhombated hecatonicosoctaexon (acronym: Tocarz) (Jonathan Bowers)

Coordinates
Coordinates are permutations of (0,1,2,2,3,3,4).

Images

Pentistericantitruncated 7-orthoplex

Alternate names
 Tericelligreatorhombated hecatonicosoctaexon (acronym: Tecagraz) (Jonathan Bowers)

Coordinates
Coordinates are permutations of (0,1,2,2,3,4,5).

Images

Pentisteriruncinated 7-orthoplex

Alternate names
 Bipenticantitruncated 7-orthoplex as t1,2,3,6{35,4}
 Tericelliprismated hecatonicosoctaexon (acronym: Tecpaz) (Jonathan Bowers)

Coordinates
Coordinates are permutations of (0,1,2,3,3,3,4).

Images

Pentisteriruncitruncated 7-orthoplex

Alternate names
 Tericelliprismatotruncated hecatonicosoctaexon (acronym: Tecpotaz) (Jonathan Bowers)

Coordinates
Coordinates are permutations of (0,1,2,3,3,4,5).

Images

Pentisteriruncicantellated 7-orthoplex

Alternate names
 Bipentiruncicantitruncated 7-orthoplex as t1,2,3,4,6{35,4}
 Tericelliprismatorhombated hecatonicosoctaexon (acronym: Tacparez) (Jonathan Bowers)

Coordinates
Coordinates are permutations of (0,1,2,3,4,4,5).

Images

Pentisteriruncicantitruncated 7-orthoplex

Alternate names
 Great  hecatonicosoctaexon (acronym: Gotaz) (Jonathan Bowers)

Coordinates
Coordinates are permutations of (0,1,2,3,4,5,6).

Images

Notes

References
 H.S.M. Coxeter: 
 H.S.M. Coxeter, Regular Polytopes, 3rd Edition, Dover New York, 1973 
 Kaleidoscopes: Selected Writings of H.S.M. Coxeter, edited by F. Arthur Sherk, Peter McMullen, Anthony C. Thompson, Asia Ivic Weiss, Wiley-Interscience Publication, 1995,  
 (Paper 22) H.S.M. Coxeter, Regular and Semi Regular Polytopes I, [Math. Zeit. 46 (1940) 380-407, MR 2,10]
 (Paper 23) H.S.M. Coxeter, Regular and Semi-Regular Polytopes II, [Math. Zeit. 188 (1985) 559-591]
 (Paper 24) H.S.M. Coxeter, Regular and Semi-Regular Polytopes III, [Math. Zeit. 200 (1988) 3-45]
 Norman Johnson Uniform Polytopes, Manuscript (1991)
 N.W. Johnson: The Theory of Uniform Polytopes and Honeycombs, Ph.D.

External links 
 Polytopes of Various Dimensions
 Multi-dimensional Glossary

7-polytopes